Duke Shim Soon-Taek or Sim Sun-taek (1824–1906) was a high-ranking official of the Korean Empire who proposed an anti-Japan policy. He came from the Cheongsong Shim clan. Gojong of Korea awarded the Order of the Plum Blossom to Shim in 1902. In 1906, Shim got the title of Duke. Shim told Gojong that he does not need a title but, Gojong replied him that the reason why he ennobled Shim was because Shim has a lot of merits.

Family
Great-grandfather:
Sim Pung-ji (심풍지, 沈豊之; 1738–1793)
Wife: Lady, of the Gigye Yu clan (증 정경부인 기계 유씨, 贈 貞敬夫人 杞溪 兪氏; daughter of Yu Eon-su (유언수, 兪彦銖) and granddaughter of Yu Cheok-gi (유척기, 兪拓基).
Grandfather:
Sim Neung-ak (심능악, 沈能岳)
Wife: Lady, of the Pyeongsan Sin clan (정경부인 평산 신씨, 貞敬夫人 平山 申氏)
Father:
Sim Ui-rin (심의린, 沈宜麟)
Wife: Lady, of the Uiryeong Nam clan (증 정경부인 의령 남씨, 贈 貞敬夫人  宜寧 南氏)
Older brother: Sim Hun-taek (심훈택, 沈勛澤)
Older sister-in-law: Lady, of the Hansan Yi clan (증 정부인 한산 이씨, 贈 貞夫人 韓山 李氏)
Adopted nephew: Sim Sang-chan (심상찬, 沈相瓚); initially the son of Sim Hui-taek (심희택).
Younger brother: Sim Yi-taek (심이택, 沈履澤)
Younger sister-in-law: Lady, of the Yangju Jo clan (정경부인 양주 조씨, 貞敬夫人 楊州 趙氏)
Younger sister: Lady Sim (부인 심씨, 夫人 沈氏)
Younger brother-in-law: Yi Jun-ha (이준하, 李遵夏) of the Jeonju Yi clan; son of Yi In-sol (이인솔, 李寅率).
Wives and children:
Lady, of the Hansan Yi clan (정경부인 한산 이씨, 貞敬夫人 韓山 李氏) – No issue.
Duchess, of the Neungseong Gu clan (공작부인 능성 구씨, 公爵夫人 綾城 具氏)
Adopted son: Sim Sang-jin (심상진, 沈相璡); his biological father was his adopted father's younger brother, Sim Yi-taek (심이택, 沈履澤). So, initially, Sim Sun-taek was Sang-jin's 2nd uncle.
Adopted daughter-in-law: Lady, of the Cheongpung Gim clan (부인 청풍 김씨, 夫人 淸風 金氏); daughter of Gim Gyu-hong (김규홍, 金奎弘) and granddaughter of Gim Hak-seong (김학성, 金學性).
Adopted grandson: Sim Yeong-seop (심영섭, 沈永燮)
1st daughter: Lady Sim (부인 심씨, 夫人 沈氏)
Son-in-law: Gim Byeong-sik (김병식, 金炳軾) of the Andong Gim clan.
2nd daughter: Lady Sim (부인 심씨, 夫人 沈氏)
Son-in-law: Yi Jung-cheol (이중철, 李重轍) of the Jeonju Yi clan.
3rd daughter: Lady Sim (부인 심씨, 夫人 沈氏)
Son-in-law: Yi Sang-gyu (이상규, 李尙珪) of the Hansan Yi clan.

References

Shim Soon-taek on Encykorea .

1824 births
1906 deaths
Korean politicians
19th-century Korean people
Officials of the Korean Empire
Politicians of the Korean Empire
Recipients of the Order of the Plum Blossom